The Butler Handicap was an American Thoroughbred horse race first run at Empire City Race Track in Yonkers, New York in 1935 as the Butler Memorial Handicap. The race was named in honor of Empire City Race Track owner James Butler who had died in 1934. Due to wartime rationing regulations, in 1943 the race was moved to Jamaica Race Course in Jamaica, New York and would remain there until its cancellation in 1953.

Historical notes
The 1935 inaugural Butler Memorial was won by future U.S. Racing Hall of Fame inductee Discovery. He was owned by Alfred Vanderbilt Jr. who would win this race three times, the most by an owner in its history. Other Butler Handicap winning horses who went on to have Hall of Fame careers were Assault, Seabiscuit, and Stymie.

In 1942, Tola Rose pulled off a major upset in front of more than 34,000 racing fans when he beat 1941 U.S. Triple Crown winner Whirlaway by four lengths. The win by Tola Rose set a new Empire City track record in what would prove to be the last time the race would be run at that facility.

Hall of Fame jockey Johnny Longden won the 1944 Butler Handicap while riding with a broken foot and a back with two broken vertebrae. When Longden finally went to see a doctor about his extreme pain he was told he might never ride again. Six months later he was back in the saddle.

Lucky Draw's win in the 1946 edition of the Butler Handicap marked the first of six track records he would set that year.

The final running of the Butler Handicap took place on November 14, 1953 and was won by Quiet Step, a horse ridden by future Hall of Fame inductee Ted Atkinson for owner Bernard Heiman's Apheim Stable and trainer Kay Jensen.

Records
Speed record:
 1:55.00 - Loser Weeper (1950) @ 1 miles

Most wins:
 No horse ever won this race more than once.

Most wins by a jockey:
 2 - Nick Wall (1938, 1939)
 2 - Robert Permane (1945, 1948)
 2 - Hedley Woodhouse (1946, 1952)

Most wins by a trainer:
 2 - Bud Stotler (1935, 1936)
 2 - Max Hirsch (1942, 1947)

Most wins by an owner:
 3 - Alfred G. Vanderbilt Jr. (1935, 1936, 1950)

Winners

References

Open middle distance horse races
Discontinued horse races in New York (state)
Empire City Race Track
Jamaica Race Course
Recurring sporting events established in 1935
Recurring sporting events disestablished in 1953
1935 establishments in New York (state)
1953 disestablishments in New York (state)